Ab Paran (also Romanized as Āb Parān; also known as Ūporon) is a village in Nilkuh Rural District in the Central District of Galikash County, Golestan Province, Iran. At the 2006 census, its population was 421, and consisted of 88 families.

References 

Populated places in Galikash County